Brierdene is a residential area and wildlife site in the north of the town of Whitley Bay, Tyne and Wear, England. The nearest city is Newcastle Upon Tyne.

The Brierdene wildlife site is maintained and managed by the Friends of Brierdene group of volunteers.

About the Brierdene
The name Brierdene comes from the Brierdene Burn that runs past the area effectively separating Whitley Lodge and Brierdene. The burn rises on farmland east of Killingworth as a trickle from the top of a slope, flows into a drainage ditch, grows to a burn, then goes under the A19 road.  South of Backworth it is joined by a tributary from the south that is approximately the same size as the Burn.  This south Brierdene Burn starts in farmland north of Holystone.  The Brierdene Burn goes around Backworth, then near the village of West Holywell, thence to the north of Earsdon, through Brierdene Farm and Whitley Bay Golf Club, through a culvert to the Brierdene wildlife site, under the seafront road to Blyth A193 road, across the beach and into the sea.

Education
Brierdene is in the catchment area for all three tiers of education. The nearest first school is Whitley Lodge First School. The nearest middle school is Valley Gardens Middle School. This then feeds on to Whitley Bay High School

Streets
Brierdene is closely interlinked with many pedestrian shortcuts between various streets: Brierdene Road, Brierdene Crescent, Hastings Avenue, Craneswater Avenue, Linton Road, Gorsedene Road, Garsdale Road, Astley Drive/ Westley Avenue, Gerrard Road and Westley Close.

Main features
Brierdene used to have its own small Post Office/ Newsagents; however, this closed down and the shop building was converted into a house. Another feature is the Green, which is used to play games on by the local children. The Brierdene wildlife site is also a major part of the area. Friends of Brierdene volunteers manage and maintain the site which has been awarded a Green Flag. An abundance of wildlife can be seen in the dene at different times of the year, including pheasants, foxes and deer. Wildflower meadows come alive in the summer attracting bees, butterflies and birds. It has been given a lottery grant to improve the area.

The Brierdene area is the location of Whitley Bay Golf Club, the entrance to which lies at the western end of the main part of the Dene.

At the eastern end of the Dene, just before it runs down to the beach, is the Briardene pub and eatery, which serves food and regularly hosts its own 'beer festivals' where a wide selection of 'visiting' real ales are served. This hostelry was the site of the former toll-bar on the then turnpike road. The western end of the estate is close to St Mary's Island and the lighthouse.

Whitley Bay